The Mexican blindcat (Prietella phreatophila), in Spanish bagre de muzquiz, is a species of North American freshwater catfish (family Ictaluridae). Until recently, it was believed to be endemic to Coahuila in the Rio Bravo drainage in northern Mexico; however, in 2016 the species was reported from the Amistad National Recreation Area, Texas, following earlier, unconfirmed sightings of blind, white catfish in the area. The captured specimens were brought to the San Antonio Zoo and Aquarium.

Habitat and conservation
The species lives only in subterranean waters and can be encountered in caves and wells. In Mexico, it is known from 12 locations. It is threatened by pollution of the groundwater and groundwater extraction.

Description
This fish is pinkish white in color and has no eyes. The dorsal fin has no spine. The adipose fin is joined to the caudal fin, which is unforked.

References

phreatophila
Cave fish
Freshwater fish of Mexico
Natural history of Coahuila
Freshwater fish of the United States
Fish described in 1954
Taxonomy articles created by Polbot